Myra Brodsky (born 1987) is a German tattoo artist and illustrator who specializes in stylized colored portraits influenced by the Victorian era, Rococo and Art Nouveau.

History 

Brodsky was born in Germany in 1987. She began tattooing in 2008 and began her own tattoo parlor in 2012 called The Decay Parlour in Berlin, which closed in 2014. Her work has been featured in VICE Germany, Deutsche Welle, Der Tagesspiegel and tattoo magazines such as Inkedmag, Total Tattoo and TätowierMagazin.

Brodsky is part of the new traditional tattoo movement which brings together traditional imagery mixed with modern ideas. Brodsky worked at the Black Mirror Parlour in Berlin, Germany until 2017. 

In 2021, she was interviewed by Forbes, explaining that her inspiration comes from old books, Film Noir, and Orson Welles.

She is now based in Munich.

See also 
List of Tattoo Artists

References

External links 
 mondialdutatouage: MYRA BRODSKY
 inked Magazine: Artists: Myra Brodsky
Artist's Instagram
Artist's homepage
 TattMag Interview with Maya Brodsky
 Get A Tatto - Tattoo İdeas

1987 births
Living people
German tattoo artists
German illustrators
German women artists